Rayark Inc. (also known as Rayark Games and Rayark International Limited) is an independent video game company headquartered in Taipei, Taiwan, and was founded in September 2011. The company also has a branch located in Tokyo, Japan. The company specializes in game development on mobile platforms and in genres such as rhythm games, casual games, sci-fi action and strategy RPGs. Rayark is best known for developing Cytus, Deemo, and VOEZ, as well as publishing MO: Astray by Archpray.

Games developed

Games published

References 

Video game development companies
Companies based in Taipei
Taiwanese companies established in 2011
Video game companies established in 2011
Video game companies of Taiwan